Romania was represented by New Star Music at the Junior Eurovision Song Contest 2006 with the song "Povestea mea". The song was selected as the winner of the Romanian national final Selecţia Naţională Eurovision Junior 2006, held on 1 June 2006.

Before Junior Eurovision

Selecţia Naţională Eurovision Junior 2006 
TVR received a total of 45 entries, in which 21 were chosen for the national final.

The final took place on 1 June 2006. 21 songs took part and the winner was determined by a 50/50 combination of votes from a jury panel and a public televote. The winner was "Povestea mea" performed by New Star Music, receiving the maximum points from the televoters and second most points from the jury.

At Eurovision

Voting

Notes

References

External links 
 Official TVR Website
 Official Romanian Junior Eurovision Site of 2006
 ESCKaz Page on Romania's Entry

Junior Eurovision Song Contest
Romania
Junior